Phalonidia remissa is a species of moth of the family Tortricidae. It is found on Cuba.

The wingspan is about 8.5 mm. The ground colour of the forewings is whitish grey, in the basal half of the wing suffused with grey and in the distal third with brownish. The hindwings are brownish white basally and brownish on the periphery.

Etymology
The species name refers to the facies of the species and is derived from Latin remissa (meaning placid).

References

Moths described in 2007
Phalonidia
Endemic fauna of Cuba